The 1988–89 FA Trophy was the twentieth season of the FA Trophy.

First qualifying round

Ties

Replays

2nd replay

Second qualifying round

Ties

Replays

2nd replay

Third qualifying round

Ties

Replays

2nd replay

1st round
The teams that given byes to this round are Enfield, Newport County, Barnet, Kettering Town, Runcorn Linnets, Telford United, Stafford Rangers, Kidderminster Harriers, Sutton United, Maidstone United, Weymouth, Macclesfield Town, Cheltenham Town, Altrincham, Fisher Athletic, Boston United, Aylesbury United, Chorley, Yeovil Town, Bath City, Wealdstone, Dartford, Marine, Bromsgrove Rovers, Burton Albion, Fareham Town, Blyth Spartans, Hyde United, Barrow, Bromley, Wokingham Town and Newcastle Blue Star.

Ties

Replays

2nd round

Ties

Replays

2nd replay

3rd round

Ties

Replays

4th round

Ties

Semi finals

First leg

Second leg

Final

Tie

References

General
 Football Club History Database: FA Trophy 1988–89

Specific

1988–89 domestic association football cups
League
1988-89